The Flag of Singapore was adopted in 1959, the year Singapore became self-governing within the British Empire. It remained the national flag upon the country's independence from Malaysia on 9 August 1965. The design is a horizontal bicolour of red above white, overlaid in the canton (upper-left quadrant) by a white crescent moon facing a pentagon of five small white five-pointed stars. The elements of the flag denote a young nation on the ascendant, universal brotherhood and equality, and national ideals.

Vessels at sea do not use the national flag as an ensign. Merchant vessels and pleasure craft fly a civil ensign of red charged in white with a variant of the crescent and stars emblem in the centre. Non-military government vessels such as coast guard ships fly a state ensign of blue with the national flag in the canton, charged with an eight-pointed red and white compass rose in the lower fly. Naval ships patrol a naval ensign similar to the state ensign, but in white with a red compass rose emblem.

The usage and exhibition of the national flag in Singapore are regulated by the regulations set forth in the Singapore Arms and Flag and National Anthem Act. From July 1st to September 30th, private citizens may include the flag in designs for other objects, as long as it is not done in a disrespectful manner.

History
Singapore was under British rule in the 19th century, having been amalgamated into the Straits Settlements together with Malacca and Penang. The flag that was used to represent the Settlements was a British Blue Ensign defaced with a red diamond containing three gold crowns—one for each settlement—separated by a white inverted pall, which resembles an inverted Y.

The Settlement of Singapore had no separate flag, although the city was granted a coat of arms which featured a lion in 1911. During the occupation of Singapore by the Japanese during the Second World War, the Japanese national flag was used on land by the military and during public events. Soon after the Second World War, Singapore became an independent Crown colony and adopted its own flag. It was modified from the Straits Settlements flag to reduce the number of crowns from three to one. Upon Queen Elizabeth II's accession to the throne, the crown within the pall was changed to the crown of St. Edward.

Singapore became self-governing within the British Empire on 3 June 1959. Six months later, upon the installation of the new Yang di-Pertuan Negara (head of state) on 3 December 1959, the national flag was officially adopted, along with the state coat of arms and the national anthem Majulah Singapura ("Onward Singapore"). Then-deputy prime minister Toh Chin Chye discussed the creation of the national flag in a 1989 interview:

The design of the flag was completed in two months by a committee headed by Toh. He initially wanted the flag's entire background to be red, but the Cabinet decided against this, as red was regarded as a rallying point for communism. Toh had opposed a red-and-white design as he considered it too similar to the flags of Indonesia and Poland, but the proposals for all-red, all-blue or blue-and-white designs were rejected. The flag, according to Toh, originally had only three stars (representing democracy, justice, and equality), but two more stars and a crescent were added later to distance it from the Malayan Communist Party emblem and to assure the Malay-Muslim community that Singapore was "not a Chinese state". According to an account given by Lee Kuan Yew, the Chinese majority wanted five stars based on the flag of the People's Republic of China while the Malay minority wanted a crescent moon to represent Islam. Both of these symbols were combined to create the national flag of Singapore.

On 30 November 1959, the Singapore State Arms and Flag and National Anthem Ordinance 1959 was passed to regulate the use and display of the State Arms and State Flag and the performance of the National Anthem. When presenting the motion to the Legislative Assembly of Singapore on 11 November 1959, Sinnathamby Rajaratnam, the Minister for Culture, stated: "National flags, crest and anthem express symbolically the hopes and ideals of a people... The possession of a national flag and crest is, for a people, symbolic of self-respect."

In September 1962, the people of Singapore voted for merger with Malaya, Sarawak, and North Borneo to form Malaysia. The process was completed on 16 September 1963, when the Malaysian flag was hoisted on Singapore by Prime Minister Lee Kuan Yew. The Singapore flag was reconfirmed as the national flag when Singapore became fully independent from Malaysia on 9 August 1965.

Design

The Singapore Arms and Flag and National Anthem Rules and the National Symbols Bill define the flag's composition and the symbolism of its elements: red symbolises "universal fellowship and equality", and white symbolises "pervading and everlasting purity and virtue". The crescent moon represents a "young nation on the ascendant". The five stars stand for the nation's ideals of "democracy, peace, progress, justice and equality". The crescent symbol is also seen by the nation's Muslim activists to represent Islam. 

The ratio of the flag is two units high by three units wide. For the manufacturing of flags, the Government of Singapore stated that the shade of red used on the flag is Pantone 032. According to guidelines published by the Ministry of Information, Communications and the Arts (MICA), the flag may be reproduced in any size and displayed at all times, but it must be in its specified proportions and colours. The material that is recommended for the national flag is bunting wool.

Regulations and guidelines
The Singaporean government dictates that no person may treat the national flag with disrespect, such as allowing the flag to touch the ground. The flag must not be displayed below any other flag, emblem or object; dipped in salute to any person or thing; or displayed or carried flat or horizontally, but always aloft and free. The use and display of the flag is governed by Part III of the Singapore Arms and Flag and National Anthem Rules made under the Singapore Arms and Flag and National Anthem Act. It is an offence to knowingly contravene specified provisions of the Singapore Arms and Flag and National Anthem Rules; the penalty is a fine not exceeding S$1,000.

Within Singapore, the national flag takes precedence over all other flags, subject to international practice. As such, when it is displayed or flown with other flags, it must be in a position of honour; that is, it should be positioned, where practical, either above all other flags or, if displayed side by side with other flags on the same level, to the left of the other flags (as seen by a person facing the flags). When the flag is raised or carried in a procession with other flags, it must be done so in front of the other flags in a single file, or on the right as seen by the standard bearers if the flags are carried side by side (i.e., on the left as seen by the viewer). The standard bearer must carry the flag high on his or her right shoulder.

When the flag is displayed on a platform or stage, it must be above all decorations and be behind and above any person speaking from the platform or stage. If it is displayed from a staff standing on the platform or stage, it must be on the right side of the person speaking from the platform or stage. Finally, when the flag is hung, it must be hung against a vertical wall or other vertical flat surface, with the crescent and stars on the top left position as seen by any spectator facing the flag and the wall or surface.

When the flag is displayed outside a building, it shall be displayed on or in front of the building only from a flagpole. If the flag is flown at night, it should be properly illuminated. The flag must not be displayed on any motor vehicle except on one in which the President of Singapore or any Government minister is travelling on official business. The flag may not be displayed on any private vessel or aircraft.

No person may use or apply the flag or any image of it for any commercial purposes or as part of any furnishing, decoration, covering or receptacle, except in such circumstances as may be approved (by MICA) in which there is no disrespect for the flag. Further, it is not permitted to use the flag as part of any trademark, or to produce or display any flag which bears any graphics or word superimposed on the design of the national flag. The flag or any image of it may also not be used or applied as or as part of any costume or attire.

The government may ask for the flag to be lowered to half-mast in the event of the death of an important person or for national mourning. No person is permitted to use the flag at any private funeral ceremony. However, the national flag can be draped on a coffin during a military or state funeral. No person may display any flag that is damaged or dirty. Any worn out or damaged flag should be packed into a sealed black trash bag before being disposed of and not left visible in dustbins.

Relaxations on its usage
The flag was originally exclusively used on or in front of buildings owned by the government, ministries, statutory boards and educational institutions on a year-round basis. The flag could only be flown by individuals and non-governmental organisations during the month of August to mark the country's national day on 9 August. 

These restrictions on individuals and non-governmental organisations were relaxed in 2004 to allow the flag to be flown year-round under certain conditions. No rationale was provided for the changes, although BBC News correspondents noted that the government had recently been trying to rally patriotic sentiment dampened by economic issues.

Following requests by Singaporeans, guidelines for the use of the flag were further broadened in 2006. MICA permitted the display of the flag on vehicles and on themselves or belongings with minimal restrictions, from the middle of July to the end of August for a trial period. The period was extended in 2007 to three months from July to September. Rules were further relaxed in 2020 during the COVID-19 pandemic to allow the flag to be flown from April to September, though this was not extended.

In 2022, the National Symbols Bill was passed, which replaces the Singapore Arms and Flag and National Anthem Act, and defines new national symbols while allowing greater flexibility in the use of the national symbols. Under the new Bill, the President can make regulations on the use of national and presidential symbols while a prescribed person such as the Minister for Culture, Community and Youth can permit or prohibit the use of national symbols in appropriate situations.

Use of the national flag

National Day celebrations
Singaporeans are encouraged to display the national flag outside their homes during National Day celebrations, and residents' committees, particularly those of public housing estates, often arrange co-ordinated displays. However, some Singaporeans decline to do so as they associate it with the ruling People's Action Party, rather than with the nation. During the period beginning 1 July and ending on 30 September of each year, any person may, without the need for the approval of the Minister under paragraph (4), incorporate the Flag or an image thereof as part of any costume or attire except that he shall do so in a manner that does not give rise to any disrespect to the Flag.

On National Day in 2007 at the Padang, 8,667 volunteers holding up red and white umbrellas formed the largest-ever representation of Singapore's flag at an event organised by Young NTUC, a youth movement associated with the National Trades Union Congress.

At other times

Outside the National Day celebrations period, the national flag of Singapore is flown from all buildings housing government and government-related departments, such as armed forces installations, court houses, offices, and educational institutions. A picture of the flag is commonly found in each classroom, and schools conduct ceremonies at the beginning of the school day at which the national flag is raised, the national anthem is sung and the national pledge is taken.

The national flag is sometimes flown by Singapore-registered vessels, although this is considered incorrect, as such vessels are required to hoist proper national colours either when entering or leaving port. The ensign is red and charged with a circle enclosing a crescent surmounted by five stars in a circle, all in white. The national flag is not used by coast guard ships and military warships; both classes of ships have their own specific ensigns.

The Singapore Government makes announcements regarding the lowering of the flag to half-mast in the event of a death of an important personage or mourning affecting the nation. The flag has been flown at half-mast during the funerals of former presidents and senior politicians, and on 9 January 2005 as a mark of respect for those who perished in the 2004 Asian tsunami disaster.

In popular culture
Singaporean composer Lim Su Chong composed a song in 1969 entitled Five Stars Arising which took the elements of the national flag as its theme. The lyrics of the song speak of a new moon, five stars and a new flag "arising out of the stormy sea". The moon is "youthful and bright and bearing hope, and tranquil as can be", each of the stars is "a lamp to guide our way; a lamp for all to see" and the flag is "crimson as the blood of all mankind, yet white and pure and free". The song is one of Singapore's patriotic songs and often sung during National Day celebrations. 

There have been several notable cases on the misuse of the flag. In January 2003, Singaporean artist Justin Lee Chee Kong was prevented by the Media Development Authority (MDA) from exhibiting a painting entitled Double Happiness— A Fantasy in Red, which consisted of the flag with red Chinese characters for double happiness on it. The MDA cited the move on the grounds that "the National Flag is a national symbol and no words or graphics should be superimposed on it". Lee reported that the work was simply a display of one's love for their country and an expression of joy at Singapore's success, and in a press statement, he asked that the piece be "treated as an artistic and complimentary interpretation of a national icon". When interviewed by The New Paper, he said "I know as a citizen that we are not allowed to do it, but this is art and I am an artist." He also complained about double standards as a Chinese artist, Gu Wen Da, had recently exhibited a national flag made of hair at the Esplanade - Theatres on the Bay. Lee felt the use of hair to create the nation's flag meant that the flag was in the wrong colours, and was distasteful.

The Rolling Stones performed in Singapore as part of their 2002/2003 Licks World Tour. At the first performance, there were two inflatable dolls on stage. Both of the dolls had flags placed in their crotch area; one had the Rolling Stones logo and the other had a Singapore flag. The dolls and the flags were removed from the second concert by the organiser.

In August 2007, a Singaporean pub, Loof, sent an email to at least 1,500 members on its mailing list featuring a close-up shot of the crotch of a female model wearing a red swimsuit or pair of underpants bearing the crescent and five stars. This was done as part of the pub's publicity campaign for its National Day events. According to Loof's marketing manager, "[T]he ad was definitely not meant as an insult to the country or anyone. I hope that the ad will be taken in the spirit of humour and fun." A majority of people polled by The New Paper felt the advertisement was disrespectful and in bad taste. MICA eventually stated that the advertisement did not breach the law as it did not fully incorporate the flag's design, with the red and white background being left out. However, director of MICA's National Resilience Division K.U. Menon said: "MICA does not encourage such ads which treat the national flag with disrespect. [...] Symbols should be treated with some measure of dignity and we hope Loof will withdraw the ad on its own initiative."

During the 2010 Asian Games held in China, the Singaporean men's water polo team's swim trunks came under controversy for inappropriately displaying the crescent moon positioned in the centre of the brief, directly over the crotch area. Critics deemed the garment insulting and an embarrassment to the country. The team was unable to modify the design further as competition rules did not permit the changing of a uniform midway through the Games. The team was apologetic over the blunder and promised to tweak the design after the competition. The garment had been designed by the team without prior approval from the authorities.

Variant flags

In addition to the national flag and ensigns, there are other flags used for official purposes.

See also
 List of Singaporean flags
 Armorial of Singapore

Notes

Further reading

Articles
 .

Books
 
 
 
  A kit on the key symbols of Singapore consisting of eight fact sheets, one booklet, one CD and one national flag.

Other media
  A documentary on the national flag and anthem of Singapore. Gives an account on how the present design of the flag was arrived at, and includes an interview with the national anthem's composer, Zubir Said.

External links

 
 The flag of Singapore at the World Flag Database
 Colours, Standards & Banners of Colonial Singapore
 Military and Paramilitary Flags of Singapore

1959 establishments in Singapore
Flags introduced in 1959
 
National symbols of Singapore
Singapore
Singapore
Singapore